Karl Karlsen may refer to:

Carl Carlsen (1880–1958), Danish wrestler
Karl Henry Karlsen (1893–1979), Norwegian politician